Lasophorus is a genus of ground spiders first described by M. Chatzaki in 2018.  it contains only two species.

References

External links

Araneomorphae genera
Gnaphosidae